Chew Reservoir is a reservoir at the head of the Chew Valley in the Peak District National Park in Greater Manchester, England.

The reservoir scheme in the Greenfield and Chew Valleys by the Ashton Stalybridge and Dukinfield Waterworks Joint Committee commenced in 1870. Chew Reservoir was built to hold 200 million gallons of water. Intended to be a compensation reservoir, it also had a filtration plant so that it could be used for drinking water in times of drought.
The reservoir is connected to the larger Dovestone Reservoir further down the Chew Valley by the Chew Brook.

References

External links

Reservoirs of the Peak District
Reservoirs in Greater Manchester